Anwar Baig (born November 1924) is a Pakistani former field hockey player who was a member of the Pakistan men's national field hockey team. He played 6 matches for Pakistan at the 1948 Summer Olympics that ended in 4th place.

See also
 Field hockey at the 1948 Summer Olympics – Men's team squads

References

External links
 

1924 births
Living people
Field hockey players at the 1948 Summer Olympics
Olympic field hockey players of Pakistan
Pakistani male field hockey players
Field hockey players from Peshawar
20th-century Pakistani people